Elections for four seats in the United States House of Representatives in Florida for the 63rd Congress were held November 5, 1912, at the same time as the election for President and the election for governor.

Background
Florida had had three seats in the House of Representatives since 1902.  After the 1910 census, Florida was apportioned a fourth seat.  Florida was not immediately redistricted, however.  For this election only, the fourth seat was elected at-large, each voter casting two votes - one for the Representative from their own district, and a second for the at-large seat.

Former President Theodore Roosevelt had launched a short-lived third party known as the Progressive Party or "Bull Moose party", who challenged the dominant Democrats in all four seats, alongside the Republicans, Socialists, and (for two seats) the Prohibitionists, resulting in an unusual 5-way election in Florida.

Election results

See also
United States House of Representatives elections, 1912

References

1912
Florida
United States House of Representatives